Rhynie may refer to:

Rhynie, Aberdeenshire, a village in Scotland
Rhynie chert, a sedimentary deposit located near the town
Rhynie, South Australia

See also
Rynie, a village in Poland